Summerlee is an unincorporated community and coal town in Fayette County, West Virginia, United States. The Summerlee Mine was located here and was owned by the New River Coal Company.

The community supposedly is named after a place in Scotland.

References

Unincorporated communities in Fayette County, West Virginia
Unincorporated communities in West Virginia
Coal towns in West Virginia